La Ultima / Live in Berlin is the sixth live album and fifth concert movie by German rock band Böhse Onkelz. The tournament movie was recorded during their last tournament "La Ultima" from August to October 2004, the concert was recorded on 18 September 2004 at the Velodrom in Berlin.

Track listing

DVD 1
 La Ultima – Tourdokumentation
 Making of… Live in Berlin
 B. O. Office
 Mexico – Live in Hamburg

DVD 2
 Intro
 Hier sind die Onkelz
 Lieber stehend sterben
 Finde die Wahrheit
 Ich bin in dir
 Buch der Erinnerung
 Danket dem Herrn
 Ja, ja
 Onkelz vs. Jesus
 Wieder mal 'nen Tag verschenkt
 Terpentin
 Nichts ist für die Ewigkeit
 Firma
 Danke für nichts
 Superstar
 Nur die Besten sterben jung
 Nie wieder
 Immer auf der Suche
 Stunde des Siegers
 So sind wir
 Für immer (Version 2004)
 Heilige Lieder
 Gehasst, verdammt, vergöttert
 Erinnerungen
 Feuer
 Auf gute Freunde
 Kirche
 Mexico
 Ihr hättet es wissen müssen
 A.D.I.O.Z. (Outro)

End-of-year charts

References

Böhse Onkelz live albums
2005 video albums
Live video albums
2005 live albums